is a Japanese radio station in Tokyo which broadcasts to the Kanto area. It is one of the two flagship radio stations of National Radio Network (NRN) (the other station is ) and is a member of the Fujisankei Communications Group.

History
The station was established in 1951 by the Society of St. Paul to promote Catholic religion on the Japanese culture. JOQR went on the air on March 31, 1952 as the Japan Cultural Broadcasting Association. Japan Cultural Broadcasting Association was formally dissolved on February 16, 1956 and the JOQR broadcast license was handed over the same day to a new succeeding company, Nippon Cultural Broadcasting Co., Ltd.

In 1957, Cultural Broadcasting established Fuji Television as part of a joint venture with Nippon Broadcasting System. Cultural Broadcasting was one of the founding companies behind the creation of the Fujisankei Communications Group in 1967. To this day, Cultural Broadcasting remains associated with the Fujisankei Communications Group and has a 3.30% ownership in Fuji Media Holdings, the company it helped established with Nippon Broadcasting System in 1957 as Fuji Television.

JOQR moved the head office from Wakaba, Shinjuku to QR Media Plus in Hamamatsuchō, Minato on July 24, 2006, and started broadcasting from Hamamatsuchō at 13:00 on the same day.

Society of St. Paul holds 30 percent of the station's shares, followed by Shogakukan (17.1%), Kodansha (9.0%) and Dai Nippon Printing (8.5%).

Headquarters
It is headquartered at QR Media Plus - 31, Hamamatsuchō 1-chōme, Minato, Tokyo, Japan.

References

External links
 Official website 

Mass media companies based in Tokyo
Radio in Japan
Pauline Family
Fujisankei Communications Group